Manhattan is an album by New York City-based anti-folk musician Jeffrey Lewis and his backing band, which is billed as Los Bolts. It was produced by Lewis himself and New York producer Brian Speaker and mixed by John Agnello. It was released on October 30, 2015 on Rough Trade Records.

Critical reception

Manhattan received generally favorable reviews from critics. For example, Paul Simpson of AllMusic gave the album 4 out of 5 stars. In his review, Simpson said that the album "focuses on tales relating to [Lewis'] home borough, resulting in some of his most personal songwriting to date"; he also described it as "one of Lewis' clearest, best-recorded and arranged albums to date".

Track listing
	Scowling Crackhead Ian	
      Thunderstorm	
	Sad Screaming Old Man	
	Back To Manhattan	
	Avenue A, Shanghai, Hollywood	
	Outta Town	
	It Only Takes A Moment	
	Support Tours	
	Have A Baby	
	Atheist Mantis	
	The Pigeon

Personnel
David Beauchamp-	Drums
Turner Cody-	Guitar
Caitlin Gray-	Bass, Keyboards, Vocals
Jeffrey Lewis & Los Bolts-	Primary Artist
Jeffrey Lewis-	Composer, Guitar, Keyboards, Primary Artist, Producer
Franic Rozycki-	Bass
Brian Speaker-	Bass, Vocals, Producer
Heather Wagner-	Drums, Tambourine, Vocals

References

Jeffrey Lewis albums
2015 albums
Rough Trade Records albums